Joginder Singh (3 August 1939 – 6 November 2002), nicknamed "Gindi", was an Indian hockey player. Playing in the right-wing position, he won the silver medal with his team at the 1960 Summer Olympics in Rome and the 1962 Asian Games in Jakarta, and then the gold medal at the 1964 Summer Olympics in Tokyo. He was born in Delhi.

After retiring, he settled in Kolkata, where he worked as a sports officer for the Bengal Nagpur Railway (BNR), which was later renamed the South Eastern Railway (SER).

He died at age 63 after a protracted kidney illness.

References

External links
 

1939 births
2002 deaths
Field hockey players from Delhi
Field hockey players from Kolkata
Olympic field hockey players of India
Olympic gold medalists for India
Olympic silver medalists for India
Field hockey players at the 1960 Summer Olympics
Field hockey players at the 1964 Summer Olympics
Indian male field hockey players
Olympic medalists in field hockey
Asian Games medalists in field hockey
Field hockey players at the 1962 Asian Games
Medalists at the 1964 Summer Olympics
Medalists at the 1960 Summer Olympics
Asian Games silver medalists for India
Medalists at the 1962 Asian Games